Yui Kamiji and Jordanne Whiley defeated Kgothatso Montjane and Lucy Shuker in the final, 6–0, 7–6(7–0) to win the ladies' doubles wheelchair tennis title at the 2021 Wimbledon Championships.

Diede de Groot and Aniek van Koot were the defending champions, but were defeated by Montjane and Shuker in the semifinals. The defeat would lead to de Groot missing out on achieving a Golden Slam in wheelchair women's doubles, and achieving a Grand Slam in doubles for the second time (after 2019), as she would win the Australian Open, French Open, US Open, and gold at the Paralympics in the discipline that year.

Seeds

Draw

Finals

References

Sources
WC Women's Doubles

Women's Wheelchair Doubles
Wimbledon Championship by year – Wheelchair women's doubles